Colin Henry Dale OLY (born 29 June 1931) is a British field hockey player. He competed in the men's tournament at the 1956 Summer Olympics. The Great Britain team finished fourth.

Dale played four times for GB and was capped 36 times for Wales.

References

External links
 

1931 births
Living people
British male field hockey players
Olympic field hockey players of Great Britain
Field hockey players at the 1956 Summer Olympics
Sportspeople from London